Madeline is a media franchise based on a series of children's books written by Ludwig Bemelmans.  The name is a variant of Madeleine.

Madeline may also refer to:

Arts and entertainment 
 Madeline (book series), by Ludwig Bemelmans and later John Bemelmans–Marciano
 Madeline (book), the first book in the series
 Madeline, a 1952 film nominated for the Academy Award for Best Animated Short Film, based on the book
 Madeline (1998 film), a live-action adaptation of Bemelmans' series
 Madeline (TV series), an American series that aired in three seasons (1993, 1995, 2000)
 Madeline (video game series), educational video games
 Madeline (Celeste), fictional character

Music 
Madeline (musician), an American folk singer-songwriter
Madeline (album), a 2008 alternative rock album by Tickle Me Pink
"Madeline", a song by Hanson on the 1997 album Middle of Nowhere
"Madeline", a song by US band Yo La Tengo on their 2000 LP And Then Nothing Turned Itself Inside-Out

Places 
Madeline, California, an unincorporated community in the United States
Madeline, West Virginia, an unincorporated community in the United States
Madeline Island, off the U.S. state of Wisconsin

Other uses
Tropical Storm Madeline, seven tropical cyclones in the eastern Pacific Ocean
2569 Madeline, an asteroid

See also 
 Maddy
 Madeleine (name), includes a list of people and fictional characters named Madeleine or Madeline
 Madeleine (disambiguation)
 Magdalene (disambiguation)
 Madaline (disambiguation)